Brother Martin High School is a private, Catholic, all-male college preparatory school run by the United States Province of the Brothers of the Sacred Heart in New Orleans, Louisiana. It was established by the brothers in 1869 as St. Aloysius College. It is located in the Roman Catholic Archdiocese of New Orleans.

School mascot and colors
The school's mascot is a crusader and the colors are crimson and gold.

Campus
Brother Martin High School is located on Elysian Fields Avenue in Gentilly, an established residential neighborhood in New Orleans. The school campus includes Cor Jesu Hall, the oldest building on the current campus; built in 1954, the Conlin Gymnasium (now fully air-conditioned), the largest high school gym in the city, and the newest components on campus; the Thomas F. and Elaine P. Ridgley Fine Arts and Athletic Center, commonly known as the "Ridgley Center", E. A. Farley Field, used for Soccer, Baseball and non-varsity football, the Roland H. & Macy Paton Meyer Science and Mathematics Building, and the James B. Branton Chapel. Renovations were also made to the Cor Jesu building, second-floor resource center, Library, Benson Mall, and Food Services.

Thomas F. and Elaine P. Ridgley Fine Arts and Athletic Center
In January 1999, over 400 alumni, Brothers and friends attended the dedication ceremony for the Thomas F. and Elaine P. Ridgley Fine Arts and Athletic Center. The dedication of this  facility was presided over by Bishop Gregory Aymond, CJ’67, hosted by Brother Ivy LeBlanc, S.C. President of Brother Martin High School and was the realization of the goal of the first phase of the Campaign for Brother Martin High School. The entrance to the Ridgley Center Lobby is on a diagonal. The diagonal sits on the Faubourg-Darcantel line, one of the oldest boundaries in the city. Upstairs in the second floor lobby, a wall of windows frame E.A. Farley Field.

E. A. Farley Field
By 1952 Brother Martin Hernandez as provincial planned and supervised the construction of Cor Jesu High School on the Gentilly site. Through his Youth Progress Program Archbishop Joseph Francis Rummel contributed $475,000 toward construction and furnishings of the new school.

From 1980 through 1983 the school purchased parcels of land from the Farley Family which was bordered by Mandeville Street, Gentilly Boulevard, St. Aloysius Drive (formerly Stephen Girard St.) and Cor Jesu Drive (formerly Marigny St.) for use in their athletic and extracurricular programs.

The field underwent a renovation as part of Phase II of the Capital Campaign during which a baseball field was constructed and additional athletic storage and restrooms were added. The playing surface was redone and drainage and a sprinkler system were installed, allowing the lower level teams to play home games on campus, although the varsity plays its home games at Kirsch-Rooney Stadium at nearby Delgado Community College. This is especially where the football team practices. And also the baseball teams.

Roland H. & Macy Paton Meyer Science and Mathematics Building

The Roland H. & Macy Paton Meyer Science and Mathematics Building opened for the 2007–2008 school year on August 17. The Meyer Building is located at the corner of Elysian Fields Avenue and Sumpter Street, the former site of the Brothers’ Residence (circa 1955). This  building houses computer, chemistry, physics and biology labs. For flexibility, eight science classrooms adjoin the three state-of-the-art lab spaces on the second floor. The first floor has seven math classrooms and a computer lab.

The James B. Branton Chapel 

The James B. Branton chapel is settled in front of the Roland H. & Macy Paton Meyer Science and Mathematics Building.

Academics
Brother Martin High School is fully accredited by the Southern Association of Colleges and Schools. The school offers college- preparatory classes to young men in grades 8–12.

There is a program specially designed for eighth grade. Eighth grade students are required to carry a minimum of six courses. The Placement Committee will place students into the appropriate level of English, math and science. An eighth grade student who fails any subject during the regular school session must successfully complete remedial work in the subject area at Brother Martin summer session before he may advance to the freshman year at Brother Martin.  It also provides a curriculum designed to develop skills and create options for higher education. Eighth grade students are required to carry a minimum of six courses including Religion 8, English 8 or English 1 honors, Introduction to Algebra, Algebra 1 or Algebra 1 honors, computer application, earth science, physical science or physical science honors, world geography and honors, health/PE, Fine Arts Survey, and electives.

To graduate, students must earn a minimum of 24 credits. Each course is equal to one credit. Freshmen, sophomores, and juniors are required to carry and successfully complete all required courses and a minimum of six credits each year, seniors must carry and complete all required courses and a minimum of five credits.

Students enrolled in all four honor courses during their sophomore year are invited into the Honors Program. A student that is participating in the Honors Program will be required to continue taking honors or advanced placement courses in English, math, science, and social studies. In addition, a student must also complete three consecutive credits of the same foreign language. The successful participation of a student in the Honors Program earns him an honors diploma at graduation.

School organization and administration
The official governing body of Brother Martin High School is the school's board of directors, which is responsible for setting school policy and regulations and hiring the school president and principal. The administration of Brother Martin is a president, the principal, dean of students, assistant principal for academics, assistant principal for admissions, and assistant principal for student services.

Athletics
Brother Martin is a member of the Louisiana High School Athletic Association and participates in District 9-5A, also known as the Catholic League for the number of Catholic schools in the district.

Brother Martin athletics started back in the early 1900s with basketball and baseball. Now over 100 years later, Brother Martin has more than 12 varsity sports for students to choose from. Brother Martin's years of athletic traditions have yielded numerous State and District Championships over the years. The school has teams in baseball, basketball, bowling, cross country, football, golf, soccer, swimming, tennis, track and wrestling- which is regarded as one of the best wrestling programs in the state, with 21 state championship titles since 1979. All teams except tennis, swimming, golf wrestling, and bowling consist of four levels of competition: eighth grade, ninth grade, junior varsity and varsity. The school has had a bowling team as a club sport for many years, but in the 2007–08 school year, it came out with a varsity bowling team. The team competes as a member of the LHSAA. Teams are selected through a tryout process.

The Crusader football team was coached for 27 seasons (1970–96) by Bobby Conlin, who compiled a 204–99–5 record, the most wins for any Catholic League coach, and the most for any New Orleans-area coach in Louisiana's highest classification. He led Brother Martin to the 1971 Class AAAA state championship with a 23–0 victory over archrival St. Augustine. The Crusaders also reached the championship game in 1989, losing 35–7 to Ouachita Parish. Conlin was posthumously inducted into the LHSAA Hall of Fame in 2003.

Brother Martin's basketball teams won state championships in three of its first five seasons following the merger of St. Aloysius and Cor Jesu. The 1969–70 team went 36–0 and was named a mythical national champion. In 1974, the Crusaders defeated the Catholic League rival Holy Cross in the championship game, led by the future University of Kentucky and NBA player Rick Robey.

Championships
National championships
(1) Basketball

State championships
(2) Baseball
(6) Basketball
(4) Bowling
(8) Cross Country
(1) Football
(1) Golf
(2) Soccer
(1) Tennis
(21) Wrestling

All championships
Baseball
1974-1975 - District, State Runner-up
1983-1984 - State
1984-1985 - State Runner-up
1988-1989 - District Tournament
1990-1991 - District
1995-1996 - State
2007-2008 - District
2009-2010 - District
2012-2013 - Undefeated District, State Quarterfinalist
2013-2014 - District, State Quarterfinalist
2014-2015 - State Semifinalist
2018-2019 - District, State Semifinalist

In addition to the listed school championships, the 1983 American Legion baseball team sponsored by Brother Martin won the Louisiana state championship and Mid-South regional and placed fourth at the American Legion World Series.

Basketball 
1969-1970 - District, State, National
1970-1971 - District, State
1972-1973 - District
1973-1974 - District, State
1978-1979 - District
1982-1983 - District Runner-up; State Semifinalist
1986-1987 - District
2002-2003 - District, State Runner-up
2003-2004 - District, State
2004-2005 - District, State
2006-2007 - District
2009-2010 - State
2011-2012 - District, State Semifinalist
2012-2013 - State Quarterfinalist
2016-2017 - District, State Runner-up
2017-2018 - State Quarterfinalist
2018-2019 - State Semifinalist
2019-2020 - State Semifinalist

Bowling 
1973-1974 - City
1977-1978 - City
1987-1988 - City
1988-1989 - City
1991-1992 - City
1994-1995 - City
1997-1998 - City
2008-2009 - State Runner-up
2009-2010 - Bi-Regional
2010-2011 - State Runner-up
2013-2014 - Undefeated District, Bi-Regional, State Semifinalist
2014-2015 - Undefeated District, Bi-Regional, State
2015-2016 - Undefeated District, Bi-Regional, State
2016-2017 - Undefeated District, Bi-Regional, State Semifinalist
2017-2018 - Undefeated District, Bi-Regional, State
2018-2019 - Undefeated District, Bi-Regional, State
2019-2020 - Undefeated District (Regional and State canceled due to COVID closure)

Cross Country 
1969-1970 - City
1970-1971 - City, District
1971-1972 - City, District, State
1972-1973 - City, District, State Runner-up
1973-1974 - City, District
1974-1975 - City, District
1975-1976 - City, District
1976-1977 - City, District
1977-1978 - City, District
1978-1979 - City, District
1979-1980 - City, District, State Runner-up
1980-1981 - City, District, State
1981-1982 - City, District, State
1983-1984 - City
1984-1985 - City, State Runner-up
1986-1987 - City
1991-1992 - City, District, State Runner-up
1992-1993 - City, District, State Runner-up
1993-1994 - State
1994-1995 - City, District, State Runner-up
1995-1996 - City, District
1997-1998 - State Runner-up
1998-1999 - State
1999-2000 - District, State
2000-2001 - City, District
2001-2002 - City
2002-2003 - City, District, State
2003-2004 - City, State Runner-up
2004-2005 - City, State Runner-up
2005-2006 - City, State Runner-up
2006-2007 - City
2007-2008 - City, State
2008-2009 - City
2011-2012 - District, Metro, State Runner-Up
2012-2013 - District Runner-Up, Metro
2014-2015- State Runner-Up
2015-2016- Metro
2016-2017 - District, Region
2017-2018 - District, Region
2018-2019 - District, Region, State Runner-Up
2019-2020 - District, Region

Football
1969-1970 - Miracle Strip Bowl
1971-1972 - District, State
1972-1973 - District
1975-1976 - Shrimp Bowl
1977-1978 - District
1978-1979 - Turkey Bowl
1983-1984 - District
1985-1986 - District
1989-1990 - State Runner-up
1992-1993 - District
2007-2008 - District
2008-2009 - District
2014-2015 - State Semifinalist
2018-2019 - State Quarterfinalist
2019-2020 - State Semifinalist

Golf 
1969-1970 - District
1970-1971 - District
1971-1972 - City
1976-1977 - District, Regional
1985-1986 - District
1988-1989 - District, Regional
1992-1993 - Regional
1993-1994 - Regional
1995-1996 - Regional
2001-2002 - District, Regional
2003-2004 - State
2006-2007 - District, Regional
2012-2013 - District
2018-2019 - Catholic League

Soccer 
1992-1993 - District
1997-1998 - District
1999-2000 - State
2000-2001 - State
2001-2002 - State Runner-up
2011-2012 - Co-District
2012-2013 - Co- District, State Semifinalist
2013-2014 - Undefeated District, State Quarterfinalist
2014-2015 - State Quarterfinalist
2016-2017 - District
2019-2020 - District, State Quarterfinalist

Swimming
1987-1988 - District, State Runner-up
1988-1989 - District, State Runner-up
1994-1995 - State Runner-up
1995-1996 - State Runner-up

Tennis 
1977-1978 - City
1984-1985 - State Runner-up
1985-1986 - City, District
1986-1987 - City, District, State
1987-1988 - State Runner-up
2011-2012 - Regional Doubles, Regional Runner-up
2012-2013 - District Runner-up, Regional Runner-up
2013-2014 - District Runner-up, Regional Runner-up
2014-2015 - District Runner-up, Regional Runner-up
2015-2016 - District Runner-up, Regional Runner-up
2016-2017 - Regional Singles, Regional Runner-up
2017-2018 - District and Regional Champions, State Runner-up
2018-2019 - District and Regional Champions, State Runner-up

Track and Field
1971-1972 - District
1972-1973 - District
1975-1976 - District
1978-1979 - District
1979-1980 - District
1982-1983 - District
1983-1984 - District
1984-1985 - District
1986-1987 - District
1990-1991 - Indoor State Runner-up
1994-1995 - Indoor State Runner-up
1995-1996 - Regional
1996-1997 - Regional
2003-2004 - District, Regional
2005-2006 - District, Regional
2007-2008 - District, Regional
2008-2009 - District, Regional
2011-2012 - District
2012-2013 - District
2013-2014 - District
2014-2015 - District

Wrestling 
1977-1978 – District, State Runner-up
1978-1979 – City, State
1980-1981 – State Runner-up
1981-1982 – City, State
1982-1983 – District, State Runner-up
1983-1984 – City, State
1984-1985 – District, State
1985-1986 – District, State
1986-1987 – District, State
1989-1990 – District
1995-1996 – District, Regional, State Runner-up
1996-1997 – District, State Runner-up
1998-1999 – District, State
1999-2000 – District, State
2000-2001 – District, State
2001-2002 – District, State
2002-2003 – District, State
2005-2006 – State Runner-up
2006-2007 – District, State
2011-2012 – District, State
2012-2013 – District, City, State
2013-2014 – Undefeated District, State
2014-2015- District, State
2015-2016- District, State
2017-2018 - District, Regional, State
2018-2019 - District, State
2019-2020 - District, State
2021-2022 - Undefeated District, State

Source:

Crusader Fight Song
"We're gonna' fight for our alma mater, for Brother Martin crimson and gold. We're gonna' fight 'till the skies resound it!  We're gonna' win over foes untold.  The Crimson Crusaders are our heroes, they are the men who never say, "Die."  So while the whole gang is here let's stand up and cheer for Brother Martin High."

Extracurricular activities
Some extracurricular activities offered include Academic Games, art and design club, book club,  Bands- Marching, Concert, and Symphonic Bands, a pep and stage band, cheerleading, chorus, CSPN (Crusader Streaming & Programming Network), Culinary Crusaders, Close-Up, cyber patriot,  drama club, Excalibur National Honor Society, fishing club, intramurals, Key Club, lacrosse, a literary magazine (The Pen and the Sword), literary rally, martial arts medical support staff, Mu Alpha Theta, National Honor Society, National Junior Honor Society, NJROTC, quiz bowl team, rugby team, speech and debate club, student ambassadors, student ministry, student recruiting team, student council, tabletop gaming club, ultimate frisbee, world culture club, and yearbook (Yesterday).

Hurricane Katrina
Hurricane Katrina forced the school to close in August 2005. Brother Martin opened a temporary facility at Catholic High School in Baton Rouge for their students. Catholic High allowed students and faculty of Brother Martin to use their facilities during its after hours. Displaced Brother Martin students continued to learn here for the remainder of 2005. Brother Martin High School reopened its doors in New Orleans in January 2006 sustaining minimal flood damage to the bottom floors. Many faculty and volunteers helped renovate and repair the damaged sections of the school.

Notable alumni

NOTE: Some of those listed below graduated from one of Brother Martin's forerunner schools, St. Aloysius (1869–1969) and Cor Jesu (1954–69)
Irv Smith Jr., football player for the Minnesota Vikings, former tight end for Alabama, and 50th overall pick in the 2019 NFL Draft
Allen J. Ellender, United States Senator, 19was President Pro Tempore of the United States Senate as well as Dean of the Senate
Arthur J. O'Keefe, former mayor of New Orleans (1926–1929)
Richard Brennan Sr. (1931–2015), New Orleans restaurateur, owned the Commander's Palace
Charles Emile "Peppi" Bruneau Jr. (born 1942), Class of 1962, New Orleans attorney and member of the Louisiana House of Representatives from 1976–2007
Garret Chachere, college football coach
Philip Ciaccio, state representative, New Orleans City Council member, state circuit judge from 1982 to 1998
Chito Martínez, Former MLB player (Baltimore Orioles)
D. J. Augustin, basketball player for the Orlando Magic, former University of Texas point guard, and 9th overall pick in the 2008 NBA Draft
Fernando del Valle (born Brian Stephen Skinner), operatic tenor
Greer Grimsley, Bass-Baritone
Rod West, Group President, Entergy Corporation; NCAA football champion, University of Notre Dame 1988
Edward Scheidt, retired Chairman of the CIA Cryptographic Center
Eric F. Skrmetta, Commissioner, Louisiana Public Service Commission
Garey Forster, radio host, former state representative and state labor secretary
Gregory Aymond, current Archbishop of New Orleans
Wayne Riley, former President of Meharry Medical College
Joseph N. Macaluso Sr. Ph.D, Col. USAR (retired), Prof Emeritus, Our Lady of Holy Cross College, St. Aloysius band member (1941-1945) under Prof. Taverna
Juan LaFonta, Louisiana State Representative, District 96
Ken Bordelon, former NFL linebacker (New Orleans Saints); co-captain of Brother Martin's 1971 Class AAAA state championship team
Paul Meany, lead singer of band Mutemath
Michael D. Perry, software engineer, photographer and writer
Pascal F. Calogero Jr., Chief Justice, Louisiana Supreme Court (retired)
Richard Simmons, fitness guru and celebrity
Rick Robey, basketball player, member of Brother Martin's 1974 state champions, 1978 NCAA champion Kentucky Wildcats and 1981 NBA Champion Boston Celtics
Don Newman, member of Brother Martin's 1974 state basketball champions; NBA assistant coach, including World Champion San Antonio Spurs 2005 & 2007. d 2018
Kevin Belton, celebrity TV chef on PBS, author and New Orleans cooking instructor. Played football at Brother Martin, LSU and the San Diego Chargers training camp.
Robert William Muench, Bishop of the Diocese of Baton Rouge
Ronald Austin Williams II, New Orleans Police Department officer, murdered in 1995 by Antoinette Frank 
Stanton Moore, drummer of New Orleans band Galactic
Tom Benson, owner of the New Orleans Saints & New Orleans Pelicans (died 2018)
Zeke Bonura, Former MLB player (Chicago White Sox, Washington Senators, New York Giants, Chicago Cubs)
Richard Pinner, Former USACE New Orleans District Geotechnical Engineering Chief, United States Army Corps of Engineers, New Orleans District, (Retired 2020)

References

External links

 The Archdiocese of New Orleans official website  
 Southern Association of Colleges and Schools

Private middle schools in New Orleans
Private high schools in New Orleans
Catholic secondary schools in New Orleans
Boys' schools in the United States
Schools accredited by the Southern Association of Colleges and Schools
Educational institutions established in 1869
1869 establishments in Louisiana